Yana Oleksandrivna Shemaeva (born 21 October 1995), known professionally as Jerry Heil, is a Ukrainian singer, songwriter and YouTuber. She began her career after launching her YouTube channel in 2012, publishing vlogs and musical covers.

Heil began her professional music career in 2017, releasing her debut extended play De miy dim with Vidlik Records. She later released the single "#OHRANA_OTMENA" in 2019, which became a top five hit in Ukraine. Her debut studio album #YA_YANA was later released in October 2019. Since beginning her YouTube channel, she has accumulated more than 34.9 million views, and 193 thousand subscribers.

Early life
Heil was born as Yana Shemaieva in Vasylkiv, a city just outside of the Ukrainian capital Kyiv. Her parents both work as private traders. Heil attended music schools in Kyiv, attending the R. Glier Kyiv Institute of Music and Petro Tchaikovsky National Music Academy of Ukraine.

Career

Early career
Heil began using her alias at the age of 15. After registering for the Russian social media service VKontakte, she used the name Jerry Mouse, referencing the cartoon character of the same name. She then changed Mouse to Heil, citing her desire to use whatever American surname she saw on the Internet first. She has expressed her embarrassment for the backstory behind her stage name, calling it "moronic".

In 2012, Heil launched her YouTube channel, where she posted vlogs and covers of songs made popular by Ukrainian and international musicians, such as Twenty One Pilots, Okean Elzy, The Hardkiss, and Kodaline. Okean Elzy frontman Svyatoslav Vakarchuk frequently republished Heil's covers of songs by the band and cited his approval of her versions.

2017–2018: Professional breakthrough and De miy dim
In 2017, Heil signed a recording contract with Ukrainian record label Vidlik Records, known for its association with Ukrainian musical group Onuka. She was introduced to the label and its founders Yengen Filatov and Nata Zhizhchenko – the leader singer of Onuka – after Heil began looking for producers to assist with her song "De miy dim". Heil then began working closely with the label, and recorded her debut extended play De miy dim with them, which was later released in October 2017.

In 2018, Heil auditioned for season nine of X-Factor Ukraine. She advanced from the initial audition in front of the judges to the bootcamp phase of the competition, where she was eliminated. After her elimination, Heil returned to music and released the singles "Kava" and "Postil"; the latter of the two releases featured her debut music video.

2019–present: "Okhrana, otmyena" and Ya, Yana
In March 2019, Heil published a portion of her upcoming single "Okhrana, otmyena" on Instagram, which she had recorded with Ukrainian producer Morphom. The track quickly gained momentum, when Ukrainian singers such as NK and Vera Brezhneva complimented and further distributed the song's snippet. Heil later released a full version of the song through YouTube the following month, where its music video has received more than 14.8 million views; "Okhrana, otmyena" additionally became a top five hit in Ukraine. Following the success of the song, Heil began pursuing songwriting, where she wrote songs for musicians including Brezhneva and the Kyiv-based band Cloudless, with Ukrainian songwriter and producer Konstantin Meladze.

In September 2019, Heil released her debut studio album Ya, Yana onto YouTube. The album included eight songs, and was commercially released the following month. In January 2020, Heil was announced to be competing in Vidbir 2020, the Ukrainian national selection for the Eurovision Song Contest 2020 in Rotterdam. Her song, "Vegan," qualified to the final, where it finished in sixth place.

Heil participated again in Vidbir  in December 2022 with her song 'When God shut the door', attempted  to represent Ukraine in the Eurovision Song Contest 2023, where Ukraine are the reigning champions. She finished in third place.

Personal life
Heil is fluent in Ukrainian, Russian, and English. Most of her songs are recorded in Ukrainian.

Copyright infringement
In August 2018, publishing company Komp Music Publishing– the licensee of Universal Music Group in Ukraine – threatened a lawsuit against Heil for her unauthorized usage of the song "Believer" by Imagine Dragons in one of her videos. The company then insisted that all Universal Music Group songs included on Heil's channel must be removed and demanded a fine of several thousand Ukrainian hryvnias for violating copyright laws. The company launched two lawsuits against Heil, which resulted Heil's channel being removed from YouTube.

AIR Music, a partner of Heil, took up the case. In a meeting between representatives from both companies, they negotiated a deal where Heil's fines were substantially lowered, and an agreement was reached regarding how many copyright infringements Heil had committed. Komp Music Publishing subsequently withdrew their lawsuits, and Heil's channel was restored.

Discography

Studio albums

Extended plays

Singles

Filmography

Awards and nominations

References

External links

1995 births
21st-century Ukrainian women singers
Living people
People from Vasylkiv
Ukrainian pop singers
Ukrainian songwriters
Ukrainian voice actresses
Ukrainian YouTubers
Women video bloggers
R. Glier Kyiv Institute of Music alumni